Toby King (born 9 July 1996) is a professional rugby league footballer who plays as a  for the Wigan Warriors, on season-long loan from the Warrington Wolves He has played for Ireland and the England Knights at international level.

He has spent time on loan from Warrington at the Rochdale Hornets in the Championship.

Background
King was born in Huddersfield, West Yorkshire, England.

Playing career
Toby is the younger brother of Adam and George King, and they played amateur rugby league together at Meltham All Blacks. They were spotted by the Wires’ Yorkshire scout Tommy Gleeson after both appeared for Huddersfield.

Warrington
King was promoted to Warrington first team squad in 2014. King made his début in July 2014 during a 72–10 victory over London, which was his only appearance in 2014. King next appeared in April 2015, scoring twice in an 80–0 rout against Wakefield Trinity.

King played in the 2016 Challenge Cup Final defeat by Hull F.C. at Wembley Stadium.
King played in the 2016 Super League Grand Final defeat by Wigan at Old Trafford.
King played in the 2018 Challenge Cup Final defeat by the Catalans Dragons at Wembley Stadium.
King played in the 2019 Challenge Cup Final victory over St. Helens at Wembley Stadium.
On 13 October 2018, King played in the 2018 Super League Grand Final defeat by Wigan at Old Trafford.

Huddersfield Giants (loan)
On 25 June 2022 it was announced that he would join the Huddersfield Giants for the remainder of the 2022 season.

Wigan Warriors (loan)
In August 2022 it was announced that King had signed for the Wigan Warriors on a season-long loan deal.

International career
In 2016 he was called up to the Ireland squad for the 2017 Rugby League World Cup European Pool B qualifiers.

In 2018 he was selected for the England Knights on their tour of Papua New Guinea. He played against Papua New Guinea at the Lae Football Stadium. King also played against PNG at the Oil Search National Football Stadium.

In 2019 he was selected for the England Knights against Jamaica at Headingley Rugby Stadium.

References

External links
Warrington Wolves profile
SL profile
Ireland profile

1990 births
Living people
England Knights national rugby league team players
English people of Irish descent
English rugby league players
Huddersfield Giants players
Ireland national rugby league team players
Rochdale Hornets players
Rugby league centres
Rugby league players from Huddersfield
Warrington Wolves players
Wigan Warriors players